Heidi Nordby Lunde (born 3 February 1973) is a Norwegian politician for the Conservative Party. A deputy representative to the Storting, she met regularly from 2013, and has been ordinary member of the Storting since 2017.

Political career
Lunde was elected as deputy to the Parliament of Norway from Oslo in 2013. She met as deputy for Ine Marie Eriksen Søreide, and was member of the Standing Committee on Finance and Economic Affairs from 2013 to 2017. She was elected ordinary representative to the Storting for the period 2017–2021, and was member of the Standing Committee on Labour and Social Affairs during this period. She was re-elected to the Storting for the period 2021–2025, and a member of the Standing Committee on Finance and Economic Affairs from 2021. She served as the leader of the Oslo Conservatives from 2018 to 2022. 

On 27 October 2021, Lunde announced that she wouldn’t be seeking re-election as leader of the Oslo Conservatives. She cited that the local chapter needed “new blood” to lead them into the 2023 local elections.

References 

Conservative Party (Norway) politicians
Members of the Storting
Politicians from Oslo
1973 births
Living people
21st-century Norwegian politicians